Radware Inc. is an American provider of cybersecurity and application delivery products for physical, cloud and software-defined data centers. Radware's corporate headquarters are located in Mahwah, New Jersey. The company also has offices in Europe, Africa and Asia Pacific regions. The company's global headquarters is in Israel. Radware is a member of the Rad Group of companies and its shares are traded on NASDAQ.

History 
Radware co-founder Roy Zisapel has served as President, Chief Executive Officer and Director since the company's inception in April 1997. In 1999, the company had an initial public offering and was listed on the NASDAQ stock exchange. Zisapel holds a 3.4 percent stake in the company. His father, Yehuda Zisapel, is the largest shareholder, with a 15 percent stake.

Acquisitions 
In January 2019, Radware expanded its cloud security portfolio with the acquisition of ShieldSquare, a market-leading bot management solutions provider.  In January 2017, Radware acquired Seculert, a SaaS cloud-based provider of protection against enterprise network breach and data exfiltration. In February 2013, Radware acquired Strangeloop Networks, a leader in web performance optimization (WPO) solutions for e-commerce and enterprise applications.  In April 2007, Radware acquired Covelight Systems, a provider of web application auditing and monitoring tools.  In February 2009, Radware acquired Nortel's application delivery business.  In November 2005, Radware acquired V-Secure Technologies, a leading provider of behavioral-based network intrusion prevention products.

Products 
Radware's products and services include cloud services (Cloud WAF, Cloud DDoS Protection, Cloud Workload Protection, Cloud Web Acceleration, Cloud Malware Protection, and Bot Manager), application and network security (DefensePro, AppWall, DefenseFlow), application delivery and load balancing (Alteon, AppWall, FastView, AppXML, LinkProof NG), and management and monitoring (APSolute Vision, MSSP Portal, Application Performance Monitoring, vDirect).

Sales markets 
The company sells its products worldwide through distributors and resellers located in the Americas, Europe, Middle East, Africa and Asia Pacific. Its customers include financial services, insurance, e-Commerce, manufacturing, retail, government, healthcare, education, and transportation services and carriers. Radware's more than 12,500 customers include Switch, Hexatom, QuadraNet, ProtonMail, Convergys, SingleHop, OnlineTech, Limelight Networks, BlackMesh and Brinkster.

Industry Recognition 
Most recently, Radware was awarded WAF and Anti DDoS Vendor of the Year at Frost & Sullivan's 2019 India ICT Awards and was positioned as a leader in IDC MarketScape for Global DDoS Prevention.  In 2018, Radware received several awards, including WAF Vendor of the Year Award (Frost & Sullivan), Cloud Computing Product of the Year (TMC and Cloud Computing Magazine), and the Fortress Cyber Security Award (Business Intelligence Group).

See also
Application delivery
Network security
Science and technology in Israel

References

Deep packet inspection
Networking companies of the United States
Networking hardware companies
Networking software companies
Software companies of Israel
Security companies of Israel
WAN optimization
Companies listed on the Nasdaq
Companies based in Tel Aviv
DDoS mitigation companies